Dunfermline City railway station, formerly Dunfermline Town, is a station in the city of Dunfermline, Fife, Scotland.

History 

The station was opened by the Dunfermline and Queensferry Railway on 1 November 1877, named Dunfermline, Comely Park.  It was rebuilt in 1889, the Down (northbound) platform being extended eastwards with a new booking office building and a new Up (southbound platform) being provided; the extended facilities were brought into use on 5 March 1890, from which date the station was known as Dunfermline Lower in contradistinction to Dunfermline Upper on the line to Stirling.  After the latter station was closed in 1968, the suffix was dropped and it became known as plain Dunfermline.  During the 1970s and 1980s British Rail only ran a regular daytime service on the Dunfermline line between Edinburgh and as far as Cowdenbeath; Lochgelly & Cardenden were only served during the weekday business peaks, whilst the remainder of the route to Thornton Junction was freight-only (having been closed to passengers in 1969). In 1989 though, BR decided to restore the Fife circular .

In March 1998, Dalgety Bay opened, while two years later in 2000, a new station was opened in the expanding eastern suburbs of Dunfermline and given the name of Dunfermline Queen Margaret, after the nearby Queen Margaret hospital. To prevent confusion following the opening of the nearby Dunfermline Queen Margaret in 2000, the station was again renamed to Dunfermline Town. Around the same time the frequency was improved to every 30mins to Edinburgh.

Following Dunfermline being granted city status, Jenny Gilruth, the Transport Minister, announced on 3 October 2022 that the station would be renamed to Dunfermline City.

Station facilities 
The station can be accessed from St. Margaret's Drive. The station building is on the northbound platform. In the building is a ticket office, a toilet (accessed by key) and a kiosk. There is also a CCTV monitoring centre for stations in the east of Scotland and a taxi ordering office.  There is a public phone at the entrance and there are waiting rooms on both platforms. The platforms are connected by a ramped subway, this providing an alternative access to the station from Woodmill Street on the south side. There is a taxi rank at the main entrance and station car parks on both sides of the railway. CCTV is in operation.

Train services 
In the evenings the service is hourly (and terminates at Glenrothes with Thornton) There is also a daily service to and from Perth via Markinch.

In 2016 the Sunday frequency service was increased to hourly, from its previous 2 hourly service .

References

Notes

Sources

External links

 RAILSCOT on Charlestown Railway
 RAILSCOT on Dunfermline and Queensferry Railway
 RAILSCOT on Dunfermline Branch of Edinburgh and Northern Railway
 Dunfermline Town station on navigable OS map
 Video footage of Dunfermline Town railway station

Railway stations in Dunfermline
Former North British Railway stations
Railway stations in Great Britain opened in 1890
Railway stations served by ScotRail
1890 establishments in Scotland